Petra Blazek (born 15 June 1987) is an Austrian handballer who plays for Hypo NÖ and the Austrian national team.

International honours
EHF Champions League:
Finalist: 2008
EHF Cup Winners' Cup:
Winner: 2013

References

Living people
Austrian female handball players
1987 births
People from Mödling
Austrian expatriate sportspeople in France
Austrian expatriate sportspeople in Hungary
Austrian expatriate sportspeople in Norway
Austrian expatriate sportspeople in Romania
Austrian expatriate sportspeople in Germany
Expatriate handball players
Austrian people of Czech descent
Sportspeople from Lower Austria